Baita District ( is a district of Liaoyang City, Liaoning province, People's Republic of China.

Administrative divisions
There are eight subdistricts within the district.

Subdistricts:
Xuwangzi Subdistrict, Baitangfang Subdistrict, Weiguo Road Subdistrict, Xinghuo Subdistrict, Zhanqian Subdistrict, Wayaozi Subdistrict, Shengli Subdistrict, Yuejin Subdistrict

References

External links

County-level divisions of Liaoning
Liaoyang